Stošíkovice na Louce is a municipality and village in Znojmo District in the South Moravian Region of the Czech Republic. It has about 300 inhabitants.

Economy
The municipality is known for its viticulture and wine-making. It lies in the Znojemská wine subregion.

References

Villages in Znojmo District